General elections were held in Saint Lucia on 28 November 2011. The result was a victory for the Saint Lucia Labour Party, which won eleven of the seventeen seats. On 30 November 2011 Labour Party leader Kenny Anthony was sworn in as Prime Minister.

Electoral System
The 17 elected members of the House of Assembly were elected by first-past-the-post voting in single member constituencies. Following the elections, a Speaker was elected, who may be from outside the House.

Results

References

Saint Lucia
General
Elections in Saint Lucia
Saint Lucia